Unspoken Words may refer to:
"Unspoken Words", a song by Status Quo from the album Piledriver, 1972
"Unspoken Words", a song by U.D.O. from the album Faceless World, 1990
"Unspoken Words", a song by Theatre des Vampires from the album Anima Noir, 2008
"Unspoken Words", a song by Gotthard from the album Need to Believe, 2009
"Unspoken Words", a song by Mxmtoon from the album The Masquerade, 2019
"Unspoken Words", a 2008 single by Ashley Alexandra Dupré
"Unspoken Words", a 2019 single by Davichi
Unspoken Words, a 1988 album by Jeff Golub
Unspoken Words, a 1989 album by Avery Sharpe
Unspoken Words, a 1996 album by Per Jørgensen and Tobias Sjøgren
Unspoken Words, a 1998 album by Jim Cohn
Unspoken Words, unfinished album by Bloodrock released as part of Triptych, 2000
"Musica proibita", 1881 Stanislao Gastaldon composition published in English under the title "Unspoken Words"

See also
Words Unspoken (disambiguation)